The 1984 Jameson International Open was a professional ranking snooker tournament that took place between 24 September to 7 October 1984 at the Eldon Square Recreation Centre in Newcastle-upon-Tyne, England.

Eugene Hughes reached the semi-finals before losing 9–3 to Steve Davis. Hughes had beaten Doug Mountjoy, Ray Reardon and Willie Thorne to reach that stage.

Defending champion Steve Davis won the tournament, defeating Tony Knowles 9–2 in the final.


Main draw

{{32TeamBracket
| RD1=Last 32Best of 9 frames
| RD2=Last 16Best of 9 frames
| RD3=Quarter-finalsBest of 9 frames
| RD4=Semi-finalsBest of 17 frames
| RD5=FinalBest of 17 frames
| team-width=210
| RD1-seed01=1
| RD1-team01=
| RD1-score01=5
| RD1-seed02=
| RD1-team02=
| RD1-score02=1
| RD1-seed03=16
| RD1-team03=
| RD1-score03=5
| RD1-seed04=
| RD1-team04=
| RD1-score04=4
| RD1-seed05=8
| RD1-team05=
| RD1-score05=5
| RD1-seed06=
| RD1-team06=
| RD1-score06=3
| RD1-seed07=9
| RD1-team07=
| RD1-score07=5
| RD1-seed08=
| RD1-team08=
| RD1-score08=1
| RD1-seed09=5
| RD1-team09=
| RD1-score09=5
| RD1-seed10=
| RD1-team10=
| RD1-score10=4
| RD1-seed11=15
| RD1-team11=
| RD1-score11=1
| RD1-seed12=
| RD1-team12=
| RD1-score12=5
| RD1-seed13=4
| RD1-team13=
| RD1-score13=1
| RD1-seed14=
| RD1-team14=
| RD1-score14=5
| RD1-seed15=12
| RD1-team15=
| RD1-score15=5
| RD1-seed16=
| RD1-team16=
| RD1-score16=3
| RD1-seed17=3
| RD1-team17=
| RD1-score17=0
| RD1-seed18=
| RD1-team18=
| RD1-score18=5
| RD1-seed19=13
| RD1-team19=
| RD1-score19=2
| RD1-seed20=
| RD1-team20=

References

Scottish Open (snooker)
Sport in Newcastle upon Tyne
International Open
International Open
International Open
International Open
20th century in Newcastle upon Tyne